Orienthella fogata is a species of sea slug, an aeolid nudibranch, a marine gastropod mollusk in the family Flabellinidae.

Distribution

This species was described from Bahía de Banderas, Mexico, Pacific Ocean.

Description
This flabellinid nudibranch has a translucent orange body and red digestive gland in the cerata. There are white spots on the outer parts of the cerata.

The description of Orienthella fogata includes a table comparing similar species from Mexico.

References

Flabellinidae
Gastropods described in 2007